The Kyiv Presidential Honor Guard Battalion is a guard of honour unit of the Armed Forces of Ukraine. It is a part of the Hetman Bohdan Khmelnytsky Independent Presidential Guard Brigade.

History 
On November 10, 1962, the Honor Guard Company of the Kyiv Military District was raised to provide public dutie operations. In 1975, the company was moved to Kyiv after being stationed in Bila Tserkva for one year. It formed the 427th Regiment of the Civil Defense of the USSR. For 16 years it was the official honor guard of the Ukrainian SSR. On March 10, 1992, an honor guard company was introduced into the brigades of the General Staff of the Armed Forces of Ukraine. A year later in 1993, the Guard of Honor of the Ministry of Defence of Ukraine was formed, and 3 years later an additional training company was created. On February 15, 2001, it was integrated into the ranks of the Independent Presidential Regiment and was renamed as the Kyiv Presidential Honor Guard Battalion.

Structure

 Battalion HQ
 1st Company 
 2nd Company 
 3rd Company (subordinated to the Ministry of Defense)
 Military Band
 Symbols Protection Company
 Training Company

All eligible candidates to join the battalion have to meet certain requirements such as fluency in the Ukrainian language, having a height of at least 180 cm, full secondary education and no physical and/or mental problems.

Traditions

Activities
The battalion takes part in events coinciding with the following Public holidays in Ukraine:

Independence Day of Ukraine
Victory Day over Nazism in World War II
State Flag Day
Constitution Day
Defender of Ukraine Day
Navy Day
Armed Forces Day

Generally, the battalion also takes part in the following different events, whether it be annual or semi-annual:

Foreign and domestic military tattoos
State visits
Award ceremonies
Ukrainian presidential inauguration
Wreath laying ceremonies at the Tomb of the Unknown Soldier in the Park of Eternal Glory
State funerals

Marching style
The battalion utilizes the native German goosestep (first introduced by King Frederick the Great) with the speed of the step being 75 steps per minute and elements of the marching pace of the Sich Riflemen Halych-Bukovyna Kurin.

Heraldry
There are many commemorative and high-ranking badges specific to the honour guard that soldiers of the battalion earn throughout their careers. One of them, called "Concordia" was developed in 2007 in honor of the 45th anniversary of the creation of the honor guard in 1962. Another badge features Michael, a figure of the coat of arms of the city of Kyiv, indicates the place of deployment of the battalion into the city, and represents the unit's status as a representative unit. The Latin language inscription on the badge: "Ubi concordia ibi victoria" (meaning "Where there is unity, there is victory" when translated) is the heraldic motto of this battalion.

Uniform
The general uniform of the battalion was unveiled on 24 August 2016 based on British and Polish military styles such as a variant of the Polish Rogatywka (the previous one was a peaked cap). The actual uniform jacket was changed from black to brown. It also incorporates details from the uniforms worn by the Ukrainian People's Army, including a cap which features an insignia of a Ukrainian Cossack grasping a cross. Although mainly designed for the Ukrainian Army, the other services represented in the based their new uniforms off of the army's update. All of this was partly done in response to the ongoing Russian military intervention and later invasion of Ukraine as well as decommunization and derussification in Ukraine to distance the battalion from its ceremonial counterparts in the Soviet Army/Russian Army.

Members of the battalion are equipped with a standard SKS rifle, which is used commonly by post-Soviet honour guards.

Sabre
In 2018, the battalion replaced the standard Soviet officer cavalry sabre (Шабля) from the 1940s with a newer model based on the "Cossack Sword" and designed by the Main Directorate of Development and Material Support. It was first unveiled at the Kyiv Independence Day Parade celebrating Independence Day and the 100th anniversary of the revival of Ukrainian statehood in August of that year. It combines historically Ukrainian designs from swords of the Cossack times with the modern military elements of the Ukrainian Armed Forces. It is in fact based on 16th century weapons used by the Ukrainian Cossacks of Zaporizhia in Eastern Europe.

Shoulder patches and rank insignia
The battalion uses the following three different patches for the three different platoons in each company who are from all three service branches. Every patch has the Ukrainian language term for guard of honour at the top and the Ministry of Defence's name at the bottom. They are identified by the following colors:

Since 1993, the same design has been used on the battalion shoulder board:

List of commanders 
 Captain I. Bondarenko (March 1993 – September 1996)
 Major I. Kozyrkov (September 1996 – July 2001)
 Major V. Plakhtiy (July 2001 – October 2004)
 Major V. Skoryk (October 2004 – November 2005)
 Major S. Klyavlin (November 2005 – June 2011)
 Lieutenant Colonel E. Golovanchuk (June 2011 – 2013)
 Major Oleksiy Pochtar (2013–2018)
 Major Yevhen Solodayev (2018–Present)

Gallery

See also 
 Guard of honour
 Independent Presidential Regiment (Ukraine)
 Special Honor Guard Battalion of the National Guard of Ukraine
 Kremlin Regiment
 Honor Guard of the Armed Forces of Belarus

External links 
 Presidential Regiment | Ukraine in Uniform
 Рота почесної варти 45-а річниця заснування.

References 

1962 establishments in Ukraine
1993 establishments in Ukraine
Military units and formations established in 1962
Military units and formations established in 1993
Military units and formations of Ukraine
Ukrainian ceremonial units
Presidency of Ukraine